Schizopetalon is a genus of plants in the family Brassicaceae.

It is native to western South America. Schizopetalon tenuifolium is found in the Atacama Desert of northern Chile.

Species
Schizopetalum bipinnatifidum 
 Schizopetalum biseriatum 
 Schizopetalum fuegianum 
 Schizopetalum sanromani 
 Schizopetalum tenuifolium 
 Schizopetalon walkeri — small annual plant, having deeply pinnatifid leaves and racemes of fringed almond-scented purple-white flowers.

References

External links
  Schizopetalum in Flora of Chile @ efloras.org

Brassicaceae
Brassicaceae genera
Flora of northern Chile
Flora of Peru